Mehdi Ballouchy (born April 6, 1983) is a retired Moroccan professional footballer who played as a midfielder. He is currently one of the coaching staff for New York City FC.

Career

Early life
At the age of 13, he joined SCC Mohammédia and played there to the age of 16. He then moved to the United States in 2000, initially living with his brother in Denver before attending Gunn High School in Palo Alto, California with a host family. He attended college and played one year of college soccer at Creighton and two at Santa Clara, where he was named first team all-American in 2005. He also briefly played with Boulder Rapids Reserve in the USL Premier Development League.

Professional

Real Salt Lake
Ballouchy signed a Generation Adidas contract with MLS and was taken second overall by Real Salt Lake at the 2006 MLS SuperDraft. During his time with RSL Ballouchy appeared in 46 league matches scoring 2 goals and recording 2 assists.

Colorado Rapids
After spending two years in Utah he was traded to Colorado Rapids for Kyle Beckerman in July 2007. During his stay with Colorado Ballouchy played primarily as an attacking central midfielder, but also saw time at right midfield. With Colorado he appeared in 77 league matches, scoring 7 goals and recording 18 assists. His most productive season for Colorado was in 2009 when he appeared in 28 league matches scoring two goals and providing seven assists.

New York Red Bulls
On September 14, 2010 Ballouchy joined New York Red Bulls in a trade for Macoumba Kandji. New York coach Hans Backe had been looking for an attacking midfielder throughout the season and the acquisition of Ballouchy ended the club's search. On September 16, 2010 Ballouchy debuted for New York wearing the number 10 shirt and scoring a goal in a 2–2 draw against FC Dallas. On October 21, 2010 Ballouchy started for Red Bulls in a 2–0 victory over New England Revolution which helped New York clinch its second regular season Eastern Conference title. On October 26, 2011 Ballouchy helped New York to a 2–0 victory over FC Dallas at Pizza Hut Park in a 2011 MLS Cup Playoffs match by assisting Joel Lindpere in scoring the club's first goal of the night.

San Jose Earthquakes
Ballouchy moved back to California as he was traded to San Jose Earthquakes on July 30, 2012 for a 2013 international spot and a conditional 2013 MLS Supplemental Draft pick. He made 6 appearances as a regular before he suffered from tearing of his anterior cruciate ligaments which kept him sideline for the rest of the season and the start of the following season.

Vancouver Whitecaps FC
Ballouchy was selected in the second stage of the 2013 MLS Re-Entry Draft by the Vancouver Whitecaps FC on December 18, 2013 and agreed to terms in January 2014.

New York City FC
New York City FC selected Medhi Ballouchy as their sixth selection in the 2014 MLS Expansion Draft on December 10, 2014. He was Given number 20 shirt.

Ballouchy announced his retirement on November 18, 2016. After working as a coach at the New York City academy he was promoted to first team assistant coach under Ronny Deila in January 2020.

International career
Ballouchy has played for various youth Moroccan national teams, including the Moroccan U-17 and U-16 national teams prior to moving to the United States at the age of 16. He wasn't called to play for the Morocco national football team at senior level.

Personal life
The son of Driss and Malika Ballouchy, his father is a former French second division football player. Ballouchy received a U.S. green card in January 2013, which qualifies him as a domestic player for MLS purposes.

Career statistics

Honors
New York Red Bulls
 MLS Eastern Conference 2010

Individual
 NYCFC Etihad Player of the month — May 2015

References

External links
 
 MLS Statistics

1983 births
Living people
Footballers from Casablanca
Moroccan footballers
Moroccan expatriate footballers
Association football midfielders
Creighton Bluejays men's soccer players
Santa Clara Broncos men's soccer players
Colorado Rapids U-23 players
Real Salt Lake players
Colorado Rapids players
New York Red Bulls players
San Jose Earthquakes players
Vancouver Whitecaps FC players
Vancouver Whitecaps FC U-23 players
New York City FC players
American people of Moroccan descent
Expatriate soccer players in the United States
Expatriate soccer players in Canada
Moroccan expatriate sportspeople in Canada
Real Salt Lake draft picks
USL League Two players
Major League Soccer players
All-American men's college soccer players
SCC Mohammédia players
New York City FC non-playing staff
Gunn High School alumni